Larne was a single-member county constituency of the Parliament of Northern Ireland.

Boundaries and boundary changes
This was a division of County Antrim. Before 1929, it was part of the seven-member Antrim constituency. The constituency sent one MP to the House of Commons of Northern Ireland from 1929 until the Parliament was temporarily suspended in 1972, and then formally abolished in 1973.

In terms of the then local government areas the constituency in 1929 comprised parts of the rural districts of Antrim, Ballymena and Larne. The division also included the whole of the urban districts of Larne and Whitehead.

Members of Parliament

Elections

The parliamentary representatives of the division were elected using the first past the post system.

 Appointment of Hanna as a County Court Judge

 Death of Robinson

 Appointment of Topping as Recorder of Belfast

 Parliament prorogued 30 March 1972 and abolished 18 July 1973

References
 Northern Ireland Parliamentary Election Results 1921-1972, compiled and edited by Sydney Elliott (Political Reference Publications 1973)

External source
 For the exact definition of Northern Ireland constituency boundaries see http://www.election.demon.co.uk/stormont/boundaries.html

Northern Ireland Parliament constituencies established in 1929
Constituencies of the Northern Ireland Parliament
Historic constituencies in County Antrim
Larne
Northern Ireland Parliament constituencies disestablished in 1973